= Idle-along =

Type of dinghy

Idle-Along
Development
- Designer: Alf (Unc) Harvey
- Location: Wellington, New Zealand
- Name: Idle-Along

Boat
- Crew: 3

Hull
- Type: Monohull
- LOH: 12 feet 8 inches (3.86 m)
- Beam: 6 feet (1.8 m)

Sails
- Upwind sail area: 160 square feet (15 m^{2})

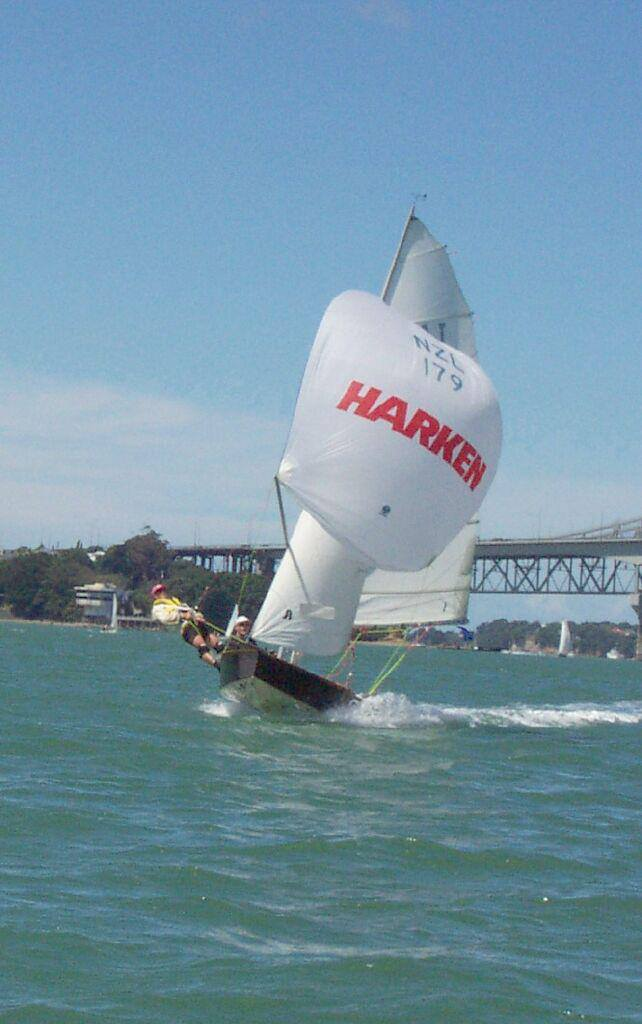
IA69 Gemini sailing at Northcote Birkenhead Yacht Club circa 2000 owner/helm Grant Blewett crew Chris Mitchell

Idle-Along (IA) - is a class of sailing dinghy (or small centreboard yacht) designed by Alf (Unc) Harvey at Petone (Wellington, NZ) in 1927. It grew to considerable popularity in the 1950s but its popularity gradually diminished during the 1960s. A redesigned hull for plywood construction by John Spencer kept the class going but on a smaller scale with a small revival in the 1990s with about 10 new boats being built. The Idle-Along is also sometimes referred to as IdleAlong, Idle Along, IA, I Class and Idie.

The premium annual trophy for the Idle-Along was the Moffat Cup - which was first sailed for in 1936. The Moffat Cup was revived in 2010 at Birkenhead and sailed again in 2011 in the Bay of Islands. The 2012 Cup was to be sailed in Taupo but economic pressure has seen the race rescheduled to Auckland as the Alf Harvey Memorial Regatta.

The Idle-Along is 12 foot 8 inches long plus bow sprit and 6-foot (1.8 m) in the beam and carries 150 sq ft (13.9 m^{2}) of sail plus spinnaker.

== See also ==
- Dinghies
- New Zealand
- Sailing
